"Who Gets the Love?" is a single released by the British Rock band Status Quo in 1988. It was included on the album Ain't Complaining.

Some versions of the 7 inch vinyl single also featured a limited edition History Pack featuring a special outer box made from card and inside part two of the Status Quo family tree - drawn and compiled by Pete Frame. "Halloween" was originally written and recorded for Rick Parfitt's unreleased solo album Recorded Delivery in 1985.

Track listing

7 inch 
 "Who Gets the Love?" (P Williams/J Goodison) (5.32)
 "Halloween" (Parfitt/Williams/Rossi) (4.58)

12 inch 
 "Who Gets the Love?" (P Williams/J Goodison) (7.09)
 "Halloween" (Parfitt/Williams/Rossi) (4.58)
 "The Reason For Goodbye" (Williams/Goodison/Parfitt/Rossi) (3.54)

CD 
 "Who Gets the Love?" (P Williams/J Goodison) (7.09)
 "Halloween" (Parfitt/Williams/Rossi) (4.58)
 "The Reason For Goodbye" (Williams/Goodison/Parfitt/Rossi) (3.54)
 "The Wanderer" (Sharon The Nag Mix) (E Maresca) (3.33)

Charts

References 

Status Quo (band) songs
1988 singles
Songs written by Pip Williams
Song recordings produced by Pip Williams
1988 songs
Vertigo Records singles